Maggie Oliver (14 December 1844 – 21 May 1892) was an Australian actor and comedian. According to the Evening News Supplement, she was the most popular Australian actress of her time, saying:

She was the most popular Australian actress of these latter days – the darling alike of dress circle, stalls, pit, and gallery. Who does not remember her joyous laugh on the stage? and let me here remark that it is not everyone who can laugh or cry "to order". Only the true artist who "feels" a character can do so; one who can pass naturally from grave to gay and make the puise of an auditor beat quicker, and such a one was Maggie Oliver. Her laugh was an inspiration, and it was infectious. It did not seem forced; the transition to tears came naturally from a heart "always open to melting charity." That was the great secret of her success. She entered for the time being into the joys and sorrows of the part she was playing, and her whole soul was in it.

She married John King in 1869, and divorced him in 1877.  She was buried in Waverley Cemetery in Sydney.

References

External links 
 

1844 births
1892 deaths
Australian stage actresses
19th-century Australian actresses
Australian women comedians